The 1972 River Oaks Tennis Tournament – Doubles was an event of the 1972 River Oaks Tennis Tournament men's tennis tournament and was held at the River Oaks Country Club in Houston, Texas in the United States from April 3 through April 9, 1972. Onny Parun and Milan Holeček were the defending doubles champion but did not take part in this edition. Roy Emerson and Rod Laver won the doubles title, defeating second-seeded Ken Rosewall and Fred Stolle in the final, 6–3, 6–3.

Draw

References

External links
 ITF tournament edition details

Tennis in Texas
1972 World Championship Tennis circuit
Louisville Open
1972 in American tennis